The women's 1500 metre at the 2011 World Short Track Speed Skating Championships took place 11 March at the Sheffield Arena.

Results

Quarterfinals

Top 2 athletes from each heat and the next 2 fastest riders qualified for the semifinals.

Heat 1

Heat 3

Heat 5

Heat 7

Heat 2

Heat 4

Heat 6

Heat 8

Semifinals

Top 2 athletes from each heat qualified for the final.

Heat 1

Heat 3

Heat 2

Final

References

2011 World Short Track Speed Skating Championships